A Divya Desam or Vaishnava Divya Desam is one of the 108 Vishnu and Lakshmi temples that is mentioned in the works of the Alvars, the poet-saints of the Sri Vaishnava tradition.

Of the 108 temples, 105 are in India, one is in Nepal, and the last two are believed to outside the earth, in Tirupparkatal and Vaikuntham. In India, they are spread over the states of Tamil Nadu (84), Kerala (11), Andhra Pradesh (2), Gujarat (1), Uttar Pradesh (4), and Uttarakhand (3). Muktinath, Saligramam is the only Divya Desam in Nepal. The Divya Desams are revered by the 12 Alvars in the Naalayira Divya Prabandham, a collection of 4,000 Tamil verses. The Divya Desams follow either Tenkalai or Vadakalai modes of worship.

Etymology
In Sanskrit, divya means "divine" and desam indicates "realm" (temple).

Geography
Divya Desams are classified into six regions: 

Chera Nadu
 Chola Nadu
 Pandya Nadu
 Pallava Nadu
 Vada Nadu
 Vinnulaga Divya Desams

Alvars and Divya Prabandham

The word Alvar in Tamil, means "the immersed", referring to the their deep devotion of God. Alvars are considered to be the twelve poet-saints of Vishnu, who were instrumental in popularising Vaishnavism during the 5th-8th centuries CE. The religious works of these saints in Tamil, their hymns of love and devotion, are compiled as the Naalayira Divya Prabandham, containing 4000 verses and the 108 temples revered in their songs are classified as Divya Desams. The saints had different origins and belonged to different varnas. According to tradition, the first three Alvars (mudhal alvargal), Poigai, Bhuthathalvar, Peyalvar and Andal were said to be born "out of divinity", Tirumalisai was the son of a sage, Thondaradi, Mathurakavi, Periyalvar were of Brahmin birth, Kulasekhara from the Kshatriya community, Nammalvar was from a cultivator family, Tirupanalvar from the panar community and Tirumangai was from the kalvar community.

The Divya Suri Saritra by Garuda-Vahana Pandita (11th century CE), Guruparamparaprabhavam by Pinbaragiya Perumal Jeeyar, Periya tiru mudi adaivu by Anbillai Kandadiappan, Yatindra Pranava Prabavam by Pillai Lokam Jeeyar, commentaries on the Naalayira Divya Prabandam, Guru Parampara (lineage of Gurus) texts, temple records and inscriptions give a detailed account of the Alvars and their works. According to these texts, the saints are considered to be incarnations of attributes of Vishnu. Poigai is considered to be an incarnation of Panchajanya (Krishna's conch), Bhoothath of Kaumodaki (Vishnu's mace), Peyalvar of Nandaka (Vishnu's sword), Thirumalisai of Sudarshana Chakra (Vishnu's discus), Nammalvar of Vishvaksena (Vishnu's commander), Madhurakavi of Vainatheya (Garuda), Kulasekhara of Kaustubha (Vishnu's gemstone), Periyalvar of Garuda (Vishnu's demigod eagle), Andal of Bhudevi (Vishnu's wife, Lakshmi, in her form as Bhudevi), Thondaradippodi of Vanamalai (Vishnu's garland), Thiruppaan of Srivatsa (An auspicious mark on Vishnu's chest) and Thirumangai of Sharanga (Vishnu's bow). The songs of Prabandham are sung in several Vishnu temples of Tamil Nadu daily and also during festivals.

Significance
In Hindu texts, these temples are often referred to as Bhuloka Vaikuntham, which in Tamil means heavens on earth. Each of the Divya Desam has its own significance related to Sri Vaishnava legend. Almost all of these temples have separate shrines for Vishnu and Lakshmi.

List of Divya Desams

The 106 earthly Divya Desam temples are spread over the Indian states of Tamil Nadu (84), Kerala (11), Uttar Pradesh (4), Uttarakhand (3), Andhra Pradesh (2) and Gujarat (1), and the country of Nepal (1) (Muktinath). The last two are believed to be outside earthly realms.

See also
Mangalasasanam
Char Dham
Nava Tirupati

References

Sources

External links

4000 Divya Prabhandam from Project Tamil
 R.K.K. Rajarajan (2012) Antiquity of the Vaiṣṇava divyakśētras in Pāṇḍinādu. Acta Orientalia, Societates Orientales Danica Fennica Norvegia Svecia, Vol. 73, pp. 59–104. 

 
Vishnu temples